The Ukrainian (Greek) Catholic Apostolic Exarchate in Germany and Scandinavia (Germany and Scandinavia for the Ukrainians) is an Apostolic Exarchate (pre-diocesan jurisdiction) of the Ukrainian Greek Catholic Church that covers the faithful in Germany and the Nordic countries Denmark, Finland, Norway and Sweden.

It is exempt (i.e. directly dependent on the Holy See and its missionary Roman Congregation for the Oriental Churches), so is not part of any ecclesiastical province.

Its cathedral episcopal see is the Kathedrale Maria Schutz und St. Andreas, dedicated to the Intercession of the Theotokos (Mary, Mother of God) and to Saint Andrew, in Munich, Bavaria, Germany. It is headquartered at Schönbergstrasse 9, D-81679 München (Munich), Germany.
 
The current Apostolic exarch is Bohdan Dzyurakh.

History 
It was established on 17 April 1959 as Apostolic Exarchate of Germany and Scandinavia, without a Byzantine rite Catholic precursor.

Episcopal ordinaries
(Byzantine rite, so far missionaries from Eastern Europe)

Apostolic Exarchs of Germany and Scandinavia
 Platon Kornyljak (7 July 1959 – 16 December 1996) (born Ukraine), Titular Bishop of Castra Martis (1959.04.17 – 2000.11.01); died 2000
''Apostolic Administrator Michel Hrynchyshyn, (16 December 1996 – 3 February 2001)
Petro Kryk (born Poland) (3 February 2001 – 18 February 2021), Titular Bishop of Castra Martis (2000.11.20 – 2021, 18.2.).
Bohdan Dzyurakh (18 February 2021 – ...)

Statistics and extent 
As per 2014, it pastorally served 40,700 Ukrainian Catholics in 16 parishes with 24 priests (diocesan), 1 deacon, 8 lay religious (brothers) and 1 seminarian.

Parishes 
In many parishes, the Ukrainian Catholics use the local Latin Rite Catholic church as a location for Divine Liturgy.

Denmark
  Sankt Ansgars kirke Cathedral, Copenhagen: 1st Sunday of each month at noon

See also 
 List of Catholic dioceses (structured view)
 Ukrainian Greek Catholic Church
 Catholicism in Germany
 Catholicism in Denmark

References

Sources and external links 
 GCatholic.org with Google map and - satellite photo
 Apostolische Exarchie für katholische Ukrainer des byzantinischen Ritus in Deutschland und Skandinavie 

Ukrainian Greek Catholic eparchies
Eastern Catholicism in Germany
Ukrainian diaspora in Germany
Roman Catholic dioceses in Germany
Catholic Church in Finland
Catholic Church in Sweden
Catholic Church in Norway
Religious organizations established in 1959
Roman Catholic dioceses and prelatures established in the 20th century
Apostolic Exarchates